HD 110956 is a single star in the southern constellation of Crux. It is faintly visible to the naked eye with an apparent visual magnitude of 4.62. The distance to this star is approximately 385 light years based on parallax and it is drifting further away with a radial velocity of 15.5 km/s. It is a probable member of the Lower Centaurus–Crux subgroup of the Scorpius–Centaurus association.

This is a B-type main-sequence star with a stellar classification of B2/3V. It is a young star, estimated to be about 8 million years old, with six times the mass of the Sun. The star is spinning with a projected rotational velocity of 22 km/s. It is radiating around 400 times the luminosity of the Sun from its photosphere at an effective temperature of 16,780 K.

There are multiple visual companions positioned near HD 110956. The brightest of these, with a visual magnitude of 8.93, is located at an angular separation of  along a position angle of 166°, as of 2020. This companion was reported by J. F. W. Herschel in 1834. It is an α2 CVn variable with the designation BR Cru.

References

B-type main-sequence stars
Lower Centaurus Crux

Crux (constellation)
Durchmusterung objects
Crucis, 45
110956
062327
4848